Monjeau Lookout was completed in 1940 by the Civilian Conservation Corps to serve as a fire lookout tower within Lincoln National Forest, New Mexico, United States, and remains in active use as a destination for forest visitors.  The structure is a  native stone tower which contains living quarters, and is topped with a  metal-frame cab.

The structure is listed on the National Register of Historic Places, as well as the New Mexico State Register of Cultural Places.

Monjeau Lookout is reached via a  National Forest gravel road, north of Ruidoso, New Mexico. There are three parking and camping areas a mile or two below the Lookout. The last mile or so of NF117 going up to the Monjeau Lookout is sometimes closed. When that is the case, no vehicle traffic goes to the top and the restroom at the top may also be closed. To reach the structure, one must then hike up the road. As of July 2021, the gate is open, but it was closed for a time in the late summer of 2020.

See also 

National Register of Historic Places listings in Lincoln County, New Mexico

References 

Government buildings completed in 1940
Towers completed in 1940
Government buildings on the National Register of Historic Places in New Mexico
Buildings and structures in Lincoln County, New Mexico
Civilian Conservation Corps in New Mexico
Fire lookout towers on the National Register of Historic Places in New Mexico
National Register of Historic Places in Lincoln County, New Mexico